The Lasosna, Lasasyanka,  is a river in Poland (Sokółka County) and Belarus (Hrodna and Hrodna district). The river is 46 km long, of which 24 km is in Poland. It is a left tributary of the river Neman.

References

Grodno
Sokółka County
Rivers of Grodno Region
Rivers of Poland
Rivers of Podlaskie Voivodeship
Rivers of Belarus